Feeling Alright may refer to:

"Feelin' Alright?", a 1968 song by Traffic, made famous by a 1969 version by Joe Cocker retitled "Feeling Alright"; also recorded by many other artists
"Feelin' Alright" (Len song), 1999 song by Canadian alternative rock group Len
Feelin' All Right, 1981 album by the New Riders of the Purple Sage
"Feeling Alright", 2007 song by Rebelution on the album Courage to Grow